The following is a list of 2023 box office number-one films in Australia by weekend.

Number-one films 
This is a list of films which have placed number one at the box office in Australia during 2023.

Highest-grossing films

In-year releases

See also
 List of Australian films of 2023
 2023 in film
 List of 2022 box office number-one films in Australia

References

External links

2023
Australia